Westcott is a semi-rural English village and former civil parish  west of the centre of Dorking on the A25 between the North Downs and Greensand Ridge, making it one of the 'Vale of Holmesdale' villages (greatly in Westcott an AONB) and is in Surrey in the direction of Guildford.

Topography
The stream then flows past the village centre near its northern farmland, flowing into Dorking and discharging at the lowest part of Dorking's former other chapelry in Pixham. The village is dominated by its main road, the A25 and rests in a valley at the foot of the steep slopes of Ranmore and the North Downs to the north and Greensand Ridge to the south. Some of the village is in the Surrey Hills AONB and its single through-road in two directions is on the annual London-Surrey cycle classic route.

In Squire's Wood, south of Westcott, is Mag's Well, one of the sources of Pipp Brook. It was formerly of some repute as a medicinal spring, and is strongly impregnated with iron. A building, ruined, existed over it, and in the Victorian period children still bathed in it.

There is a thatched dovecot on the village green. The weather vane on top of the dovecot has had the N replaced by a T such that it now shows the letters WEST.

On Westcott Heath, Mesolithic wind blown sand deposits, lying on outcrops of the Folkestone Formation can be seen.

History

Westcott or Westcote lay in the Wotton Hundred.  Along with superseded Milton, it was the upper borough, turned into a chapelry of Dorking also in the Victorian period.  The lower hamlet being Pixham As such, it contributed significantly to the wealth and trade of Dorking, including in the wool and meat from sheep farming on the North Downs within the parish bounds.

Bury Hill, between Dorking and Westcott, was recorded in the 15th century. It became a manor, formed from waste (infertile land) of the manor of Milton, Dorking. James Walter bought the land in 1753, he built the house there and planted the grounds. He died 1780, when the 3rd Viscount Grimston, his daughter's husband, succeeded him. In 1812 his son and heir, about to be created Earl of Verulam, sold it to a wealthy scot, Robert Barclay and it descended to his Barclay heir in the Edwardian period when The Nower was "a favourite place to walk for Dorking people". He was the ancestor of comedy executive/producer Humphrey Barclay.

Many pre-1800 listed buildings including some that are thatched are in the lanes leading off the A25, including Leslie Howard's (actor 1893–1943) Stowe Maries (built in the 1550s) in Balchins Lane. Milton Street and Westcott Street lead to several more old buildings. The Church of the Holy Trinity is Grade II* as it was commissioned to be designed 1851, by Sir George Gilbert Scott made of knapped flint with ashlar quoins/dressings.  Its spire has a clock, striking bell and weather vane. The church is built of stone, with a small western turret. Charles Barclay of Bury Hill gave  for it to be built, and Lady Mary Leslie the same as an endowment. The clock was installed to commemorate the Jubilee of 1887. The parsonage was built at the expense of Barclay and the secular Westcott School was built by subscription in 1854; the infant school by subscription in 1882.

It was the second nearest village, with some trade, to John Evelyn's Wotton House and Estate, well known by the diarist, garden landscaper and society favourite in the mid to late 17th century; in 1694 Evelyn moved into his completed house.

Economy and amenities

Of the original six public houses The Prince of Wales remains. The Crown closed in September 2011 and is being converted into private housing. The others were the Bricklayers' Arms, the Cabin, the Cricketers'  and Uncle Tom's Cabin.  'The Cricketers' was converted into an Indian restaurant called the Bay Leaf   but it failed and the building is now derelict.

The village has an art gallery, a small shop, a bicycle shop and a hairdressers. The main village grocery with Post Office closed in December 2016. The village has difficult parking and is busy with cyclists every weekend.

Westcott Church of England primary school celebrated its 150th anniversary in 2004.  In 2010 it was merged with Abinger Common CEP school to create a two-campus school known as the Surrey Hills Church of England Primary School.

In 2009 a skate ramp and football goals were installed in the village park.

Demography and housing

The average level of accommodation in the region composed of detached houses was 28%, the average that was apartments was 22.6%.

The proportion of households who owned their home outright compares to the regional average of 35.1%.  The proportion who owned their home with a loan compares to the regional average of 32.5%.  The remaining % is made up of rented dwellings (plus a negligible % of households living rent-free).

See also

Gallery

References

External links

Obsessive Compulsive Hoarder Channel 4 programme that features Westcott, reviewed here

Mole Valley
Villages in Surrey